The men's English billiards singles tournament at the 2002 Asian Games in Busan took place from 7 October to 8 October at Dongju College Gymnasium.

The players were seeded based on their final ranking at the same event at the 1998 Asian Games in Bangkok. Praprut Chaithanasakun 	of Thailand won the gold after beating Kyaw Oo of Myanmar in the final.

Schedule
All times are Korea Standard Time (UTC+09:00)

Results

References 
2002 Asian Games Official Report, Page 287

External links 
 Official Website

Cue sports at the 2002 Asian Games